Chile and Indonesia established diplomatic relations in 1964. Both are members within the Non-Aligned Movement, WTO,  Pacific Economic Cooperation Council, Asia-Pacific Economic Cooperation, and the Cairns Group. Indonesia maintains an embassy in Santiago. Chile maintains an embassy in Jakarta.

History

Established in 1964, relations were strengthened by the establishment of the Indonesian embassy in Santiago in March 1991. Chile–Indonesia Comprehensive Economic Partnership Agreement has eliminated tariffs on various products traded between the countries since 2019.

See also
Foreign relations of Chile
Foreign relations of Indonesia

References

External links
 (Indonesia-Chile Bilateral Relations)
 (Study on Potential Free Trade Agreement)
 (Indonesia's outreach towards Latin America)

 
Indonesia
Bilateral relations of Indonesia